Marco Paparone (born 3 September 1994) is a former Australian rules footballer who played for the Brisbane Lions in the Australian Football League (AFL). He was educated at John Curtin College of the Arts. He was drafted by the Brisbane Lions with their second selection and twenty-third overall in the 2012 national draft, having previously played with the East Fremantle Football Club in the West Australian Football League. He made his debut in the sixty-three point loss against  in round 4, 2013 at Etihad Stadium.

Paparone was delisted at the end of the 2018 season.

References

External links

1994 births
Living people
Brisbane Lions players
East Fremantle Football Club players
Australian rules footballers from Western Australia
People educated at John Curtin College of the Arts
Australian people of Italian descent